Cnephasia incessana is a species of moth in the family Tortricidae first described by Francis Walker in 1863. However the placement of this species within the genus Cnephasia is in doubt.  As a result, this species may be referred to as Cnephasia (s.l.) incessana. This species is endemic to New Zealand.

References

incessana
Moths described in 1863
Moths of New Zealand
Endemic fauna of New Zealand
Taxa named by Francis Walker (entomologist)
Endemic moths of New Zealand